The 1967 Asian Champion Club Tournament was the first edition of the annual Asian club football competition hosted by the Asian Football Confederation. 

Six teams, as their respective country's domestic champions, competed in a knockout tournament to determine the first Asian champion: the Iranian FA did not send a team, while India's representative, Indian Railways, withdrew before the tournament due to excessive travel costs. 

Hapoel Tel Aviv F.C. from Israel became the inaugural champions of Asia after defeating Selangor FA from Malaysia 2–1 in the final at Bangkok, becoming one of only two teams in history to win their continent's main club competition while only playing one match (the other was Adelaide City, who won the 1987 Oceania Club Championship).

Result

First round

|}
1: Hapoel were drawn against the representative of  Iran, but the Iranian FA did not send a team.

Second round

|}

Semi-finals

|}
1: Hapoel were drawn against   Indian Railways, who withdrew before the tournament due to excessive travel costs.

Final

References

External links
Asian Club Competitions 1967 at RSSSF.com

1
1967